King Street Junior Revisited is a continuation of the earlier BBC radio comedy King Street Junior. The show debuted in 2002 on BBC Radio 4 and ran for four series until 2005. It starred Carolyn Pickles and Marlene Sidaway.

Cast
 Carolyn Pickles as Mrs. Devon
 Marlene Sidaway as Miss. Lewis
 Michael Cochrane as Mr. Maxwell
 Paul Copley as Mr. Long
 Teresa Gallagher as Miss. Featherstone
 Jacqueline Beatty as Miss. Reid
 Janice Acquah as Mrs. Khan

Episodes

Series 1

Series 2

Series 3

Series 4

Broadcast History
The show was originally broadcast on BBC Radio 4. Repeats of the show later aired on BBC Radio 7 and BBC Radio 4 Extra.

Multimedia
The four series of the show are published by Penguin and available to purchase at Audible.

External links
 British Comedy Guide
 King Street Junior Revisited at epguides.com

References

BBC Radio comedy programmes
2002 radio programme debuts
BBC Radio 4 programmes